Scrum-half is the name of playing positions in both rugby football sports:
 Scrum-half (rugby league)
 Scrum-half (rugby union)